The British Rail TC (Trailer Control) multiple units were unpowered fixed formations of 3 or 4 carriages with a driving position at each end of the set, converted by BR's Holgate Road carriage works from locomotive-hauled Mark 1 carriages in 1966-1967 and 1974. The units built on experience gained from the prototype 6TC unit. In time the 3 car units (3TC, numbered in the series 3xx) were reformed into four car units (4TC numbered in the series 4xx) to match the rest of the fleet and later classified as Class 442. This was later changed to Class 491, under which they spent the majority of their working lives. Shortly before withdrawal they were reclassified Class 438 and the units were renumbered to 8001-8034.

Operation
The units were primarily employed on services between London Waterloo and Weymouth. One or two 4TC units would be propelled from London to Bournemouth by a  4REP unit, controlled from the leading cab. At Bournemouth, one or both 4TCs would continue over the then unelectrified line to Weymouth, hauled by a Class 33/1 diesel locomotive, leaving the 4REP at the London end of Bournemouth station. Up trains from Weymouth would follow the same procedure in reverse: the Class 33/1 locomotive would propel its train to Bournemouth (controlled from the 4TC leading cab). There the 4TC/s would couple to the waiting 4REP which would then power the whole formation to London, leaving the Class 33/1 locomotive at Bournemouth to await the next such service. 4TC units were occasionally seen on other duties such as Waterloo to Salisbury, the Clapham Junction to Kensington Olympia shuttle before that line was electrified and surplus units were also used on Sundays to operate Portsmouth Harbour to Reading direct services during the late 1970s & early 1980s. They were pressed into general service as needed, often deputising for electric trains when the power was switched off and occasionally on inter-regional Southern Region services. They ventured further afield on special duties or rail-tours, including Birmingham, Cardiff, Barnstaple/Meeth & Meldon Quarry. Until the closure of the Swanage branch, a small number of through 4TC workings to/from Waterloo were operated, also using class 33/1 locomotives in similar style to the Weymouth trains.

The spare driving trailer second open (DTSO) number 76331 was equipped with an 'updated' interior - the seats were replaced with Inter-City style individual bucket seats (as used in the contemporary Mk2A/B/C carriages) and fluorescent lighting to match. This modified car was then placed into unit 417 from the early 1970s, and the displaced 76302 was kept spare at Bournemouth Traction Maintenance Depot.
No general refurbishment was ever undertaken on the units (see below regarding the work undertaken on 76327) and most of them ran with their original incandescent lighting until withdrawal. A feature of a journey in a 2x4TC/4REP train with the 4REP pushing, was severe jolting at station restarts; this upset many a hot drink over the years. This was particularly prevalent at stations on a descending gradient such as New Milton in the down direction. There would be sometimes several jolts of varying intensity until the couplings were fully compressed.
The Units were fitted with a motor-generator set for lighting supply and a single compressor; these drew power from the REP or loco through the ETH jumpers.

In 1986, two 4TC sets were temporarily converted to 4TCB (Trailer Control Buffet) by removing the TFK coaches and inserting buffet coaches from withdrawn 4REP units. They were designated as the class 492/8 and numbered set 802 and 807. This was in part to compensate for the loss of the Buffet in TC+REP formations as those units were withdrawn over a period of time for scrapping to give up their traction equipment for the new Mk3 based Wessex Electrics.

In December 1987, the two 4TCB sets and four other 4TC sets were converted to 4TCT (Trailer Control Trolley) sets. The buffet coaches in the 4TCB sets and TFK coaches in 4TC sets were replaced with TFK coaches from redundant 4TC sets modified to take catering trolleys. They were designated the class 438/1 and numbered sets 101-106.

Following the withdrawal of the 4REP units, three temporary 5TCB sets were formed in 1988 by inserting REP buffet cars into 4TC sets. They were also designated as the class 492/8 and numbered sets 804, 807 and 809.

On occasion, class 33/0 locomotives were substituted for unavailable 33/1s; in this event the loco had to run-round at Weymouth and the starting bell Loudaphone inter-carriage telephone system system could not be used, the guard having to resort to the use of a green flag to start the train at station stops.

At the time that the Clapham Junction - Kensington Olympia service was being run by Network South East with Class 73 traction DTSO number 76327 was part equipped with a modernised interior. The driving end was fitted with 4CEP style windows, ceiling (with fluorescent lights and luggage racks but with 3+2 Class 319 seating.

Accidents and incidents
On 25 February 1979, 4TC unit No. 414 formed a passenger train that was hauled by Class 33 locomotive 33 115. The train was in collision with an engineering train near , Hampshire. The crane in the engineering train was foul of the adjacent line, and a side-long collision occurred, severely damaging the locomotive and damaging all four carriages. One person was killed and nine were injured.
The two trains derailed and collided with a third train, formed of 4VEP units 3004 and 3425 running in the opposite direction on an adjacent line. Thirty-five people were killed, 415 were injured.

Description
The units were built in two batches. In the first batch, a total of 123 locomotive-hauled Mark 1 carriage were converted comprising 63 TSO to DTSO on Lot 30764, 32 BSK to TBSK on Lot 30765 and 28 FK to TFK on Lot 30766.

In the second batch, 14 locomotive-hauled carriages were rebuilt comprising 2 BSK to TBSK on Lot 30855, 6 FK to TFK on Lot 30856, and 6 TSO to DTSO on Lot 30857. This work included converting the three 3TC units to 4TC. The 1974 build units were fitted with double-glazed windows (except for the sliding toplights) as fitted to contemporary CIG/BIG stock.  They also differed from the 1967 units in having the contemporary CIG/BIG style of seating throughout, as all coaches were new-build.

Individual vehicle numbering is shown in the table below.

Further use

Following withdrawal from passenger service, several vehicles were sold for further use with London Underground. They were used primarily for special excursions trains on the Metropolitan line, hauled by either steam locomotives, or the preserved electric locomotive No. 12 "Sarah Siddons".

Details of the vehicles sold to London Underground are given below. For further information, see London Underground coaching stock.

Six 4TC vehicles were formed into a test train in 1994 for use by Eurostar to test the third rail pick-ups for use by the Class 373 EMUs. This train consisted of two DTSOs, three TFKs and a TBSK, combined with a Class 73 locomotive and converted Class 33 Driving Van.

Preserved set 417, running with only three coaches, and preserved class 33/1 33103 were hired to Silverlink for a short time in August 1999 for use on the North London Line.

Preservation
Two complete units and several other vehicles have been preserved. Unit no. 417 was one of the final two units in service with British Rail. The unit (highlighted pink) was one of two used by London Underground, and will ultimately be based on the Swanage Railway, And the unit (highlighted blue) is used by London Underground on special charters.

DTSO 76275 was originally going to be used with Hastings Diesel Limited Class 201 but now belongs to the Swanage Railway Trust, and will now replace a DTSO currently in their set.

Details are given below.

Model
In June 2016 it was announced a OO gauge model produced by Bachmann would be produced in collaboration with Kernow Model Rail, the models are available in a choice of six different livery variations.

References

Sources

Further reading

438
Train-related introductions in 1966
750 V DC multiple units